Atlético Boxing Club is an Argentine football club located in the city of Río Gallegos, Santa Cruz. The team currently plays in Torneo Regional Federal Amateur, the regionalised fourth division of the Argentine football league system.

History
The club was founded in 1920 by a group of neighbors. The name "Boxing Club" was suggested by the first deputy chairman of the club, Alfonso Martínez, a boxing fan.

Boxing Club had an important social role in the city of Río Gallegos, being responsible for creating the first volunteer fire department of Patagonia in February 1926.

In football, the Río Gallegos team is affiliated with Liga de Fútbol Sur. At domestic level, the Boxing Club got close to promote to Primera División in 1973, but the team lost to Cipolletti de Río Negro and All Boys de La Pampa, missing the chance to join the elite of Argentine football.

In 2014, Boxing Club won its first national title. The team of Río Gallegos was one of the winners of Torneo del Interior, defeating Banfield de Puerto Deseado at the final stage, therefore promoting to Torneo Federal B, the regional tournament that succeeded Torneo Argentino B.

Team 2022-23 
december, 04 of 2022

Honours

National
  Torneo del Interior (1): 2014

Regional
 Liga de Fútbol Sur (19): 1963-64, 1964–65, 1967–68, 1968–69, 1970–71, 1974–75, 1975–76, 1976–77, 1986–87, 1987–88, 1991–92, 2005–06, 2006–07, 2007, 2011, 2014–15, 2016, 2017 y 2018.

References

External links

 Official website (archived)

Association football clubs established in 1920
Football clubs in Santa Cruz Province, Argentina
1920 establishments in Argentina